Metin Hakverdi (born 25 June 1969) is a German lawyer and politician of the Social Democratic Party (SPD) who has been serving as a member of the Bundestag for the Hamburg-Bergedorf-Harburg constituency since the 2013 German federal election.

Early life and education
Hakverdi attended high school in Simi Valley, California, in 1985/86 and studied law at the Christian-Albrecht University in Kiel and at Indiana University’s Maurer School of Law.

Political career

Career in state politics
Before being elected to the Bundestag, Hakverdi was a member of the Parliament of the Free and Hanseatic City of Hamburg from 2008 to 2013. During his time in Hamburg Parliament, he served on the Budget Committee, among others.

Member of the German Parliament, 2013–present
Hakverdi currently serves on the Bundestag’s Budget Committee as well as the Committee on European Union Affairs. He is a member of the German-American Parliamentary Friendship Group, a member of Atlantikbrücke, a member of the German-Israeli Parliamentary Friendship Group. Within his parliamentary group, he has been chairing a working group on relations with North America since 2018.

Hakverdi was a John F. Kennedy Memorial Policy Fellow at Harvard University and a Distinguished Visitor at the American Institute for Contemporary German Studies at Johns Hopkins University.

Other activies
 German Council on Foreign Relations (DGAP), Member
 German United Services Trade Union (ver.di), Member

Personal life
Hakverdi is of ethnic Turkish origin.

References

External links 

  
 Bundestag biography 

1969 births
Living people
Members of the Bundestag for Hamburg
Members of the Bundestag 2021–2025
Members of the Bundestag 2017–2021
Members of the Bundestag 2013–2017
German politicians of Turkish descent
Members of the Bundestag for the Social Democratic Party of Germany